The Seer is an Italian thriller and horror film directed by Luigi Desole and written by Luca Pesaro and Noelle Siri. It stars Michele Morrow, Bella Thorne, Alexander Fiske-Harrison, Katia Winter, Domiziano Arcangeli, Paul Marc Davis, Lisa Franks and Michael Graves. The film was released on September 6, 2007. It was filmed in Sardinia, Italy.

Synopsis 
Claire Sue (Michele Morrow) travels to an island in the Mediterranean. The island is home by a bloodthirsty and  a dangerous sect who prepare to wake an ancient power that threatens to destroy mankind. They begin a hunt to find the missing key that will awaken their God, the heiress and descendant of the immortal, Claire.

Cast 
Michele Morrow as Claire Sue
Bella Thorne as Young Claire Sue
Alexander Fiske-Harrison as Paolo Lazzari
Katia Winter as Ada
Domiziano Arcangeli as Lupo
Paul Marc Davis as Adam
Lisa Franks as Francesca Sue
Michael Graves as Professor Giusti
Ashlie Victoria Clark as Sheila
Irena A. Hoffman as Agata
Paul di Rollo as Luigi Bronzetti
Amanda Fullerton as Magistrate Bianchi
Richard Kinsey as Sergio Sue
Emilio Roso as Michele Sue
Marco Spiga as Bassano / Curator Soru
Zondra Wilson as Dr. Blake

References

External links 

2007 films
English-language Italian films
2000s English-language films
2000s Italian films